Sir Joseph Ernest Petavel KBE FRS D.Sc. (14 August 1873 – 31 March 1936) was a British physicist.

He was born in London and educated at Lausanne, Geneva, before he joined University College, London, in 1893, where he studied mechanical and electrical engineering. He was elected a Fellow of the Royal Society in 1907.

He was the second director of the NPL in Bushy Park from 1919 to 1936, living in Bushy House. During his time there he devised the Petavel gauge for the measurement of the pressures within exploding gases.

He was invested Knight Commander of the Order of the British Empire (KBE) in the 1920 civilian war honours for his wartime work as Chairman of Aerodynamics Sub-Committee of the Advisory Committee on Aeronautics.

He died at Bushy House and was buried in the west side of Highgate Cemetery.

References

External links

 Sir Joseph Ernest Petavel
 

1873 births
1936 deaths
Scientists from London
Alumni of University College London
Scientists of the National Physical Laboratory (United Kingdom)
Knights Commander of the Order of the British Empire
Fellows of the Royal Society
Burials at Highgate Cemetery